Gary L. Gregg II (born October 2, 1967), holds the Mitch McConnell Chair in Leadership at the University of Louisville and is director of the McConnell Center. He is the author or editor of several books including The Presidential Republic, Patriot Sage: George Washington and the American Political Tradition, and Securing Democracy – Why We Have an Electoral College, which will be coming out in an updated version soon. He is a teacher and has been the national director of the Intercollegiate Studies Institute.

Education
Gregg holds a M. A. and a Ph.D. from Miami University, Oxford, Ohio, granted in 1991 and 1994 respectively. Before that, he obtained a B. A. Cum Laude at the Davis and Elkins College in Elkins, West Virginia in 1990.

Selected bibliography

Books

Children's books

References

External links

1967 births
Davis & Elkins College alumni
Living people
University of Louisville faculty
Miami University alumni